Robert Georgio Enrico (13 April 1931 – 23 February 2001) was a French film director and scriptwriter best known for making the Oscar-winning short An Occurrence at Owl Creek Bridge (1961).

He was born in Liévin, Pas-de-Calais, in the north of France, to Italian immigrant parents, and died in Paris.

Filmography as director
 Fait d'hiver (1999)
 Saint-Exupéry: La dernière mission (1996) (TV)
 Vent d'est (1993)
 La Révolution française (1989) (segment "Les Années Lumière")
 Le Hérisson (1989) (TV)
  (1987)
  (1986)
 Au nom de tous les miens (1985) (TV miniseries)
 Au nom de tous les miens (1983)
Heads or Tails (1980)
  (1980)
 Un neveu silencieux (1977)
 Le vieux fusil (1975) – César Award for Best Film
 Le Secret (1974)
  (1972)
 Boulevard du Rhum (1971)
 Un peu, beaucoup, passionnément... (1971)
 Ho! (1968)
 Tante Zita (1967)
 Les aventuriers (1967)
 Les Grandes Gueules (1966)
 Le Théâtre de la jeunesse: La redevance du fantôme (1965) (TV)
 Contre point (1964)
 La Belle vie (1963) – Prix Jean Vigo
 Au coeur de la vie (1963) – feature film comprising the Ambrose Bierce adaptations La Rivière du hibou, Chickamauga, and L'oiseau moqueur
 La Rivière du hibou (1962) – "An Occurrence at Owl Creek Bridge", episode of The Twilight Zone (1964)
 Chickamauga (1962)
 L'oiseau moqueur (1962)
 Montagnes magiques (1962)
 Thaumetopoea, la vie des chenilles processionnaires du pain et leur extermination contrôlée (1961)
 Thaumetopoea (1960)
 Jehanne (1956)
 Paradiso terrestre (1956) (co-director)

References

External links
 

1931 births
2001 deaths
People from Liévin
French film directors
French people of Italian descent
Best Director César Award winners
Burials at Montparnasse Cemetery